Maureen Herman (born July 25, 1966) is an American writer and a musician known as the bassist for the Minneapolis-based band Babes in Toyland from 1992 until 1996 and from 2014 until August 2015.

Biography

1966–1991: Early life and education
Herman was born July 25, 1966 in Philadelphia but raised in Libertyville, Illinois, and attended Libertyville High School. She worked on the high school paper Drops of Ink with Tom Morello of Rage Against the Machine and The Nightwatchman; Adam Jones of Tool; and Jim Naureckas, editor at Fairness and Accuracy in Reporting (FAIR).

Herman was introduced to punk, new wave, and alternative culture at an early age through schoolmate and high school friend Stephanie Brown, whose brother was an album cover artist for clients like Warner Bros., Beserkley Records, The Tubes, and The Stranglers. Through this connection, she attended her first rock concert at age twelve, where she saw The Stranglers and met Hugh Cornwell. Shortly after, she saw and met The Tubes, and was given a rudimentary drum lesson by Prairie Prince.

Midway through her senior year of high school, Herman moved to Prior Lake, Minnesota, though her high school diploma is from Libertyville High School.

She attended the University of Minnesota, with a major of Film Studies and minor in Journalism, and lived in Minneapolis. In January 1985, during freshman year winter break at University of Minnesota, Herman went back to Illinois to help produce a horror spoof, The Season of the Snow Bitch, with LHS alumni, notably Morello and Jones, whose band the Electric Sheep provided the soundtrack for the video.

Through Shannon Selberg, vocalist for Minneapolis noise rock band Cows, Herman met the other members of Babes in Toyland prior to their formation as a band. In 1988, after her brother injured his hand in a restaurant pasta machine accident, Herman inherited his bass guitar and started her first band, M&M Stigmata. The band booked a show before writing any songs or having a practice. Babes in Toyland's Kat Bjelland was in attendance at the band's debut at Minneapolis' Uptown Bar, where the three-piece band's singer and guitarist showed up impaired and unable to play the guitar. Bjelland recorded the show, which was played with drums, bass, and vocals only.

In 1989, Herman moved to Chicago, where she quickly became part of the burgeoning indie scene that included Steve Albini, The Jesus Lizard, Touch and Go Records, and the beginnings of the Billions Booking Agency. In 1992, while attending Columbia College Chicago and working in the English Department, Herman was invited to replace Babes in Toyland's departing bassist Michelle Leon. At the time, Herman was the bassist for Chicago band Cherry Rodriguez.

1992–1996: Babes in Toyland
Herman replaced Leon as Babes in Toyland bassist in 1992. Herman described her initiation into the band (Harmony Central, 8/23/00):

"An old friend phoned with news that the bassist had quit the band and asked if I'd like to join. That band, Babes in Toyland, had just signed to Reprise and was about to record their major label debut. I joined. In two weeks I was on tour, with a recording session scheduled immediately after we got off the road."

She played on the band's albums Fontanelle and Nemesisters and the Painkillers EP. She sang lead vocals on the Nemesisters cut "Killer on the Road". AllMusic described her bass playing as a "gut-pounding, throttling beat".

Herman was again reunited with her Libertyville High School classmates Morello and Jones on 1993's Lollapalooza, when Babes in Toyland, Rage Against the Machine, and Tool were all playing the alternative rock tour that year.

She recounted her state of mind when she quit the band after four years, citing health issues (South Loop Review, Vol. 1):

"I couldn't remember the last time I had enjoyed music either as a player or a listener. It had been far too long. Warner Bros. and the rest of their dysfunctional family had chewed up all the good parts, leaving only the greedy, ugly parts exposed."

After Herman left, the band played sporadically with other bassists for several years, but never released another studio album.

1997–2013: Post-Babes in Toyland
Herman went on to work as associate editor for Musician magazine and freelance journalist for Rolling Stone. In 1998, Herman started her own company, Pollyanna, which was involved in the music business in various forms, including management, booking, promotion, publicity, and music publishing. In 2000, she produced Hank Williams III's CMT-circulated video "You're the Reason", directed by P.W. Long.

In late 2000, at age 34, Herman entered her first rehabilitation for alcoholism while living in New York City. The following year, Herman was in lower Manhattan during the September 11 attacks, an event which left her with post-traumatic stress disorder. She subsequently relocated to Nashville, Tennessee. During this period, she developed a crack cocaine addiction, which spanned several years. In June 2003, she suffered a gang rape which resulted in a pregnancy. She ultimately kept the child, and gave birth to a daughter, Anna, in 2004.

In June 2006, Herman joined San Francisco start-up Fuzz, a music, technology, and e-commerce platform and social networking community where she began as Senior Director of Business Development. In  March 2008, Herman became editor-in-chief of Fuzz editorial section The Fix.

In June 2008, Herman changed to an advisory position at Fuzz and founded non-profit venture Project Noise Foundation, which she started with former Fuzz colleague Chris Skarakis. In spring of 2008, Project Noise partnered with Morello, Amnesty International, and Axis of Justice on The Nightwatchman's Justice Tour, featuring artists Perry Farrell, Ben Harper, and Wayne Kramer, among others. The tour aimed to spotlight regional social justice causes and activism combined with music in two-day events across the U.S.

In September 2009, Herman moved to Los Angeles to continue as executive director of Project Noise. The Foundation produced a short video for fellow nonprofit, Jail Guitar Doors.

2014–present: Babes in Toyland reunion; departure
In 2014, Herman rejoined the reunited Babes in Toyland.

In August 2015, Herman was fired from the band, for originally unspecified reasons. In December 2015, Herman revealed that the reason she had been asked to leave the band was due to an article she had written for the website Boing Boing on the sexual assault of Runaways bassist Jackie Fox by manager Kim Fowley in 1975 and Joan Jett's denial of having witnessed it. Herman said that because of drummer Lori Barbero's business connections with Jett, namely Barbero producing an album for a band under Jett's record label, Blackheart Records, Herman was kicked out of the band for what Barbero believed to be hurting possible future business between Barbero and Jett.

References

Sources

External links

 Fuzz: Maureen Herman
 Fuzz: Babes in Toyland
[ AllMusic: Babes in Toyland]
 "Great Managers & How to Find Them", Harmony Central, August 23, 2000
"Yeah... Why Not...", South Loop Review, Vol. 1
Project Noise

1966 births
Living people
Guitarists from Minnesota
University of Minnesota alumni
People from Libertyville, Illinois
Women bass guitarists
20th-century American bass guitarists
20th-century women musicians